Thomas Burke or Tom Burke may refer to:

Public officials
Thomas Burke (Clare politician) (1876–1951), Irish independent legislator
Thomas Burke (North Carolina) (c. 1747–1783), Irish-born physician, lawyer and politician
Thomas Burke (Seattle) (1849–1925), American jurist and railroad builder
Sir Thomas Burke, 3rd Baronet (1813–1875), Irish legislator
Thomas A. Burke (1898–1971), American Democratic city executive and legislator from Ohio
Thomas Henry Burke (civil servant) (1829–1882), Irish Catholic Permanent Under Secretary in Britain's Irish Office
Thomas Henry Burke (politician) (1904–1959), American politician from Ohio
Thomas J. Burke (North Dakota judge) (1896–1966), American jurist; justice of North Dakota Supreme Court
Tom Burke (Australian politician) (1910–1973), Labor Party legislator for the Division of Perth
Sir Thomas Kerry Burke (born 1942), New Zealand Labour Party Member of Parliament for Rangiora and West Coast 
T. J. Burke (Thomas James Burke, born 1972), American-born Canadian legislator

Clergymen
Thomas Burke (bishop) (circa 1709–1776), Irish Roman Catholic clergyman
Thomas Nicholas Burke (1830–1882), Irish Roman Catholic theologian and preacher
Thomas Martin Aloysius Burke (1840–1915), Irish-born Roman Catholic clergyman
Tom Burke (priest) (1923–2008), Irish Carmelite priest, physicist and schoolteacher

Sports personalities
Tom Burke (footballer, born 1862) (1862–1914), Welsh footballer
Tom Burke (hurler) (fl. 1865–1887), Irish hurler
Thomas Burke (athlete) (1875–1929), American sprinter in 1896 Athens Olympics
Tom Burke (American football) (born 1976), American defensive end in National Football League
Tom Burke (Irish footballer), Ireland footballer

Others
William Burke (pirate) (died 1699), sometimes known as Thomas Burke, Irish pirate active in the Caribbean, associate of William Kidd
Thomas Burke (artist) (1749–1815), Irish engraver and painter known for mezzotint
Thomas Burke (author) (1886–1945), English poet and author
Thomas Burke (businessman) (1870–1949), Australian businessman and philanthropist
Tom Burke (Irish revolutionary and sportsman) (1894–1967), Irish revolutionary, sportsman and referee
Thomas Burke (Medal of Honor) (1833–1883), U.S. Navy sailor and peacetime Medal of Honor recipient
Thomas Burke (soldier) (1842–1902), Medal of Honor recipient for valor on June 30, 1863
Thomas Burke (tenor) (1890–1969), British operatic tenor
Thomas Ulick Burke (1826–1867), bank manager and victim of the Break-o-Day murder in gold-rush Victoria
Tom Burke (actor) (born 1981), English television, film and stage actor
Tom Burke (environmentalist) (born 1938), British academic and writer on environmental policy issues
Tomás Burke (fl. 1600–02), Irish gentleman and soldier
Thomas Burke, character in Mafia III

See also
Burke (surname)
Tommy Burks (1940–1998), American Democratic legislator in Tennessee